Angels Revenge, or Angels Brigade, is a 1979 American comedy action film directed by Greydon Clark and distributed by Arista Films. It is also known as Angels' Brigade and Seven from Heaven.

The film has major roles for Peter Lawford and Jack Palance as the leaders of a drug cartel, and gives minor roles to character actors Jim Backus, Alan Hale, Jr., Pat Buttram and Arthur Godfrey (playing himself).  Of the actresses who played the movie's seven female protagonists, however, the closest any had previously come to any degree of fame was Susan Kiger, who had been the Playboy Playmate of the Month for January 1977.  Kiger played singer Michelle Wilson; her co-stars were Sylvia Anderson  as stuntwoman Terry Grant, Lieu Chinh as martial arts instructor Keiko Umaro, Jacqueline Cole as high-school teacher April, Noela Velasco as model Maria, and Robin Greer as policewoman Elaine Brenner.  Her younger sister Liza Greer plays high-school student Trish, who invites herself into the team.  Jack Palance played chief antagonist Mike Farrell, assistant to Lawford's kingpin character.

Plot
The film focuses on seven women who decide to fight the local drug cartel after the brother of Michelle Wilson, a Las Vegas pop singer, is found severely beaten.  When taken to the hospital, the young man is found to have been on illegal drugs.  The singer meets with April, her brother's teacher, and the two hatch a plan to destroy the local drug processing plant.  They recruit four more women with special skills and connections to help them carry out their audacious goal. As they plan their first strike, they discover high-schooler Trish spying on them.  The student gets relegated to phone duty, but eventually worms her way into their escapades.  The "Angels" not only destroy the processing plant, but also manage to intercept one of the shipments.  As a result, the women receive unwelcome attention from the local drug cartel.

Critical response
The film was poorly received by the critics and general public, being seen as a cheap knockoff of Charlie's Angels. The plot was seen as contrived. It also had a number of actors, primarily Lawford and Palance, whose popularity had fallen since the 1960s.

Mystery Science Theater 3000
Because of the poor response, the film faded into obscurity until 1995 when it was featured on the movie-mocking television series Mystery Science Theater 3000. It was edited to fit their timeslot; for example, Miller (Neville Brand) is listed in the opening credits, but only mentioned towards the end, never actually appearing on screen.

RiffTrax
In 2017, former MST3K writers and cast members Bridget Nelson and Mary Jo Pehl riffed the uncut film as a video-on-demand for RiffTrax.

See also
B movie
Rural purge
Pulp Fiction - Fox Force Five referenced on said MST3K episode

References

External links
 
 

1979 films
1970s action comedy films
American action comedy films
1970s English-language films
Films directed by Greydon Clark
Girls with guns films
1979 comedy films
1970s rediscovered films
Rediscovered American films
1970s American films